Gankhuyagiin Gan-Erdene (born 29 March 1993) is a Mongolian boxer who has qualified to compete at the 2016 Summer Olympics to be held in Rio de Janeiro, Brazil.

At the 2015 Asian Amateur Boxing Championships held in Bangkok, Thailand, he won a bronze medal, losing to Rogen Ladon of the Philippines in the semifinals after wins against Ham Jong Hyok of North Korea in the quarterfinals and Kim Won Ho of South Korea in the first preliminary round.

In April 2016 he defeated 2014 Commonwealth Games silver medallist Devendro Singh Laishram of India in the third place bout at AIBA Asian/Oceanian Olympic Qualification Event, held in Qian’an, China to qualify for the Olympic men's light flyweight.

References

External links
 

1993 births
Living people
Mongolian male boxers
Boxers at the 2014 Asian Games
Olympic boxers of Mongolia
Boxers at the 2016 Summer Olympics
Universiade medalists in boxing
Boxers at the 2018 Asian Games
Universiade bronze medalists for Mongolia
Asian Games competitors for Mongolia
Light-flyweight boxers
Medalists at the 2013 Summer Universiade
21st-century Mongolian people
20th-century Mongolian people